Villagatón is a municipality located in the province of León, Castile and León, Spain. According to the 2004 census (INE), the municipality has a population of 734 inhabitants.

Villagatón is part of the historical region of La Cepeda.

Villages
Los Barrios de Nistoso
Tabladas y Villar
Brañuelas
Culebros
Manzanal del Puerto
Montealegre
Requejo y Corús
La Silva
Ucedo
Valbuena de la Encomienda
Villagatón

References

External links 
La Maragatería y Cepeda

Municipalities in the Province of León
La Cepeda